103 (one hundred [and] three) is the natural number following 102 and preceding 104.

In mathematics

103 is the 27th prime number. The previous prime is 101, making them both twin primes. It is also a happy number.

103 is a strictly non-palindromic number.

See also
 103 (disambiguation)

References

Integers